Chlorocypha helenae is a species of jewel damselfly in the family Chlorocyphidae.

The IUCN conservation status of Chlorocypha helenae is "NT", near threatened. The species may be considered threatened in the near future. The IUCN status was reviewed in 2018.

References

Further reading

 

Chlorocyphidae
Articles created by Qbugbot
Insects described in 1984